Valery Ruzhnikov (born 24 December 1939) is a Soviet sailor. He competed in the Dragon event at the 1968 Summer Olympics.

References

External links
 

1939 births
Living people
Soviet male sailors (sport)
Olympic sailors of the Soviet Union
Sailors at the 1968 Summer Olympics – Dragon
Sportspeople from Arkhangelsk Oblast